Louis de Lorraine, Duke of Joyeuse (11 January 1622 – 27 September 1654, Paris) was a younger son of Charles, Duke of Guise and Henriette Catherine de Joyeuse.

Life

He was appointed Grand Chamberlain of France in 1644, shortly after the Guises were permitted to return from their exile in Florence. Louis XIV having returned the confiscated lands of Joyeuse, and the title "Joyeuse", to the once disgraced Guises, upon his majority in 1647 Louis de Lorraine was granted the title Duke of Joyeuse, the duchy of his maternal ancestors.

As Colonel General of the light cavalry, he served as a volunteer at the siege of Gravelines in 1644, and in two other campaigns. ("His company of mounted guards and their trappings were the finest possible", commented a newsletter of the time.) He died in Paris from a wound in his right arm, received on 22 April 1654, while charging the enemy near Arras. He was buried at Joinville near his paternal ancestors.

He married on 3 November 1649, in Toulon, Marie Françoise de Valois (d. 1696), daughter of Louis Emmanuel, Duke of Angoulême, who succeeded her father in 1653. Mentally unstable (imbécile), she was confined, by her mother, to the chateau of Ecouen or at the Hotel d'Angouleme. A few years after their marriage, Marie was sent to the abbey of Essey. They had two children:

 Louis Joseph, Duke of Guise (1650–1671) married Élisabeth Marguerite d'Orléans
 Catherine Henriette (1651–1655/56)

References

Sources

Further reading
 Jules Fériel,Notes historiques sur la ville et les seigneurs de Joinville (Paris: Ladrange, 1835), pp. 137, 144-146
 Bibliothèque  nationale de France, mss. Dossiers bleus, "Lorraine", 403, fol. 25

Joyeuse, Louis, Duc de
Joyeuse, Louis, Duc de
Louis
Dukes of Angoulême
Counts of Eu
Grand Chamberlains of France
Princes of Lorraine
17th-century French people